Hackers Creek is a tributary of the West Fork River,  long, in north-central West Virginia in the United States. The stream is believed to have been named for a settler named John Hacker (1743-1824), who lived near the creek for over twenty years from around 1770. He was a magistrate and patriarch in the settlement despite not being able to write.

According to the West Virginia Department of Environmental Protection, approximately 69% of the Hackers Creek watershed is forested, mostly deciduous.  Approximately 28% is used for pasture and agriculture, and less than 1% is urban.

Variant spellings
According to the Geographic Names Information System, Hackers Creek has also been known historically as:
Hacker's Creek
Hackers Crick
Heackers Creek
Heckers Creek

NB: Neighboring Barbour County, West Virginia, also has a (much smaller) Hacker's Creek, a tributary of the Tygart Valley River, about 3 miles downstream from Philippi.

See also
List of West Virginia rivers

References 

Rivers of West Virginia
Rivers of Lewis County, West Virginia
Rivers of Harrison County, West Virginia
Rivers of Upshur County, West Virginia